Korea Squash Federation is the national organisation for Squash in Republic of Korea.

KSF was founded in May 1989, as the name of Korea Squashball Association, and changed its name as the current in November 1992. In January 1993, the organization joined World Squash Federation as a member country, and also joined Asian Squash Federation on June in the same year. KSF, which was officially recognized as the  affiliated sports organization of Korea Sports Council, now has 17 local and 5 international branches, and also leads Korea University Squash Federation.

References

External links 
  Official website

Squash
National members of the World Squash Federation
Squash in South Korea
1989 establishments in South Korea
Sports organizations established in 1989